Ashraf W. Tabani (17 December 1930 – 16 July 2009) was a Pakistani businessman and politician who was the Governor of Sindh and the Provincial Minister of Finance, Industries, Excise and Taxation between 1981 and 1984 during Muhammad Zia-ul-Haq's term of office as the President of Pakistan. He was born to Tabani business family and belonged to the Gujarati-speaking Memon community.

See also
 Habib Wali Mohammad, brother

References

l

1930 births
2009 deaths
Memon people
Governors of Sindh
People from Karachi
Pakistani people of Gujarati descent
20th-century Pakistani businesspeople